From Beyond the Unknown was the title of an American science fiction comic book series published by DC Comics from 1969 to 1973.

Publication history
From Beyond the Unknown was published as a bi-monthly comics anthology series for 25 issues, from October–November 1969 to November–December 1973. There was an extra month's gap in mid–1973, between issues #22 and #23, and the series was cancelled at the end of that year.

From Beyond the Unknown was an anthology series, whose tagline promised to provide "Stories that Stagger the Imagination". The series reprinted stories from earlier DC Comics anthologies, including Strange Adventures and Mystery in Space. Covers featured such imaginative settings as an alien auctioneer preparing to sell the Earth, or an ape-man trying to conquer the world.

The title was revived in March of 2020, as part of the DC 100-Page Giant comic Line.

Creators

Writers
Otto Binder
John Broome
Gardner Fox
Sid Gerson
Edmond Hamilton
France Herron
Sam Merwin, Jr.
Joe Millard
Jack Miller
Ruben Moreira
Denny O'Neil
Manny Rubin
Joe Samachson
 
Artists
Neal Adams
Murphy Anderson
Sy Barry
Nick Cardy
Mort Drucker
Frank Giacoia
Joe Giella
John Giunta
Jerry Grandenetti
Sid Greene
Carmine Infantino
Michael Kaluta
Gil Kane
Joe Kubert
Jim Mooney
Ruben Moreira
Bob Oksner
Bernard Sachs
Mike Sekowsky
Henry Sharp
Howard Sherman
Manny Stallman
Alex Toth
Wally Wood

References

External links
 
 From Beyond the Unknown at Cover Browser
 From Beyond the Unknown at Mike's Amazing World of Comics

1969 comics debuts
1973 comics endings
Comics anthologies
DC Comics titles
Science fiction comics